Pálína María Gunnlaugsdóttir (born 2 January 1987) is an Icelandic sport TV host, basketball coach and a former player. She is currently a host for Stöð 2 Sport's Domino's Körfuboltakvöld (English: Domino's Basketball Night). During her career she won the Icelandic championship five times and was named the playoffs MVP in 2011 and 2013. Pálína was named the Úrvalsdeild Domestic Player of the Year three-times, in 2008, 2012 and 2013.

Playing career
Pálína started her senior team career with Haukar during the 2000-2001 season. She later played for Keflavík, Grindavík and Snæfell.

Icelandic national team
Between 2006 and 2016, Pálína played 36 games for the Icelandic national basketball team.

Coaching career
In 2019, Pálina was hired as an assistant coach to the Icelandic women's national basketball team.

In April 2021, she replaced Margrét Sturlaugsdóttir as head coach of Stjarnan women's team.

Awards and honors

Awards
3x Úrvalsdeild Domestic Player of the Year (2008, 2012, 2013)
2x Úrvalsdeild Playoffs MVP (2011, 2013)
6x Úrvalsdeild Defensive Player of the Year (2005-2008, 2012, 2013)
4x Úrvalsdeild Domestic All-First Team (2008, 2011-2013)
1x Icelandic Cup Finals MVP (2011)

Titles
5x Icelandic champion (2006, 2007, 2008, 2011, 2013)
5× Icelandic Basketball Cup (2005, 2007, 2011, 2013, 2015)
4x Icelandic Supercup (2006, 2007, 2008, 2016)
6x Icelandic Company Cup (2005, 2006, 2007, 2008, 2010, 2015)
2x Icelandic Division I (2002, 2004)

References

External links
Icelandic statistics 2008-present
Eurobasket.com Profile

1987 births
Living people
Palina Gunnlaugsdottir
Palina Gunnlaugsdottir
Palina Gunnlaugsdottir
Palina Gunnlaugsdottir
Palina Gunnlaugsdottir
Palina Gunnlaugsdottir
Shooting guards